Edmund Robertson may refer to:

Edmund Robertson, 1st Baron Lochee (1845–1911), Scottish barrister, academic and politician
Edmund F. Robertson (born 1943), Scottish mathematician